Bingley is a civil parish in the metropolitan borough of the City of Bradford, West Yorkshire, England.  It contains 102 listed buildings that are recorded in the National Heritage List for England.  Of these, one is listed at Grade I, the highest of the three grades, six are at Grade II*, the middle grade, and the others are at Grade II, the lowest grade.  The parish contains the town of Bingley and the surrounding countryside to the north, east and south, including the villages and settlements of Cottingley, Eldwick, Gilstead, and Micklethwaite.

Most of the listed buildings are houses, cottages and associated structures, farmhouses and farm buildings.  The Leeds and Liverpool Canal and the River Aire run through the parish and the listed buildings associated with the canal are the Five Rise Locks, the Three Rise Locks, the Two Rise Locks, two aqueducts, and two bridges.  The other listed buildings include churches, chapels and associated structures, an ancient cross, the Butter Cross, an old market, a set of stocks, road bridges, a footbridge and a former packhorse bridge, schools, a former library, a railway station and goods depot, a bandstand, former textile mills and a tannery, a former fire station, a former malthouse, two war memorials, and a telephone kiosk.


Key

Buildings

References

Citations

Sources

 

Lists of listed buildings in West Yorkshire
 Listed